Eurozonosia fulvinigra is a moth of the subfamily Arctiinae. It was described by George Hampson in 1914. It is found in the Democratic Republic of the Congo, Kenya, Rwanda and Uganda.

References

 

Lithosiini
Moths described in 1914